Felipe Fernández (9 July 1933 – 13 January 2012) was an Argentine basketball player.

References

1933 births
2012 deaths
Argentine men's basketball players
1959 FIBA World Championship players
Basketball players at the 1955 Pan American Games
Pan American Games medalists in basketball
Pan American Games silver medalists for Argentina
Medalists at the 1955 Pan American Games